The Zambia women's national cricket team represents the country of Zambia in international women's cricket.

In April 2018, the International Cricket Council (ICC) granted full Women's Twenty20 International (WT20I) status to all its members. Therefore, all Twenty20 matches played between Zambia women and another international side after 1 July 2018 are eligible to have full WT20I status.

Zambia's was part of the Botswana 7s tournament in August 2018 against Botswana, Lesotho, Malawi, Mozambique, Namibia and Sierra Leone however Zambia's matches were not classified as WT20Is as they had a Botswana player in their squad.

Zambia had their membership suspended by the International Cricket Council in 2019 due continued non-compliance to amend multiple breaches of the ICC's Membership Criteria, relating to general competence and an acceptable detailed governance system. With Zambia failing to address the ICC's concerns, their membership was terminated in 2021.

References

Women's
Women's national cricket teams
Cricket